The 2020 Mississippi Valley State Delta Devils football team represented Mississippi Valley State University as a member of the East Division of the Southwestern Athletic Conference (SWAC) during the 2020–21 NCAA Division I FCS football season. The Delta Devils were led by third-year head coach Vincent Dancy and played their home games at Rice–Totten Stadium.

On July 20, 2020, the Southwestern Athletic Conference announced that it would not play fall sports due to the COVID-19 pandemic, which includes the football program. The conference is formalizing plans to conduct a competitive schedule for football during the 2021 spring semester.

Previous season
The Delta Devils finished the 2019 season 2–9, 1–6 in SWAC play to finish in last place in the East Division.

Schedule
Due to the SWAC's postponement of the 2020 football season to spring 2021, games against Nicholls, Sam Houston State, and Virginia–Lynchburg were canceled. The SWAC released updated spring schedules on August 17.

Game summaries

at Jackson State

Arkansas–Pine Bluff

at Alabama State

References

Mississippi Valley State
Mississippi Valley State Delta Devils football seasons
Mississippi Valley State Delta Devils football